William F. Haddock (November 27, 1877 – June 30, 1969) was one of the earliest film directors of the silent film era. From 1909 to 1919 Haddock directed twenty-four films.

Haddock was born William Frederick Haddock in Portsmouth, New Hampshire. He directed his first film, The Boots He Couldn't Lose, in 1909. His next film was  The Immortal Alamo in 1911, the earliest known film version of the events surrounding the 1836 Battle of the Alamo. It starred Francis Ford. No copy of that film exists today, and it is considered to be a lost film, as are many of Haddock's works.

Many of his films during his early years were film shorts, starring lesser known actors and actresses. He often teamed up with early film actor Lamar Johnstone, the first time being in the 1913 film Hearts and Crosses, co-starring Lucille Young. That same year he married his wife, Rosa Koch.

His last direction was on the 1919 film The Carter Case, starring Herbert Rawlinson, Marguerite Marsh, and Ethel Grey Terry. Following that film, Haddock left the film business, eventually settling in New York City. Little is known about his life following his departure from film directing, except that he played the role of an old man in Arthur Penn's 1962 adaptation of The Miracle Worker. He died on June 30, 1969, in New York City.

Selected filmography

Billy and His Pal (1911)
Hearts and Crosses (1913)
The Education of Mr. Pipp (1914)
His Lordship's Dilemma (1915)
The Carter Case (1919)
 The Mad Dancer (1925)

References

External links

Silent film directors
1877 births
1969 deaths
People from Portsmouth, New Hampshire
Articles containing video clips